James Edmondson may refer to:

James Edmondson (builder) (1857–1931), English property developer 
J. Howard Edmondson (1925–1971), Governor of Oklahoma from 1959 to 1963
James E. Edmondson (born 1945), Oklahoma Supreme Court Justice
James Larry Edmondson (born 1947), U.S. federal judge 
James Edmondson, 1st Baron Sandford (1887–1959), British politician